Holy Rights is a 2020 Urdu documentary film directed by Farha Khatun on Bharatiya Muslim Mahila Andolan's work on Muslim women's divorce issues relating to triple talaq in India. It was presented at the 26th Kolkata International Film Festival.

Awards and recognition 
Holy Rights documentary shared the 2021 Indian National Film Awards for best film on social issues.

References 

Indian documentary films
2020 documentary films
2020 films
Documentary films about Islam
Documentary films about women in India